The Guzhangian is an uppermost stage of the Miaolingian Series of the Cambrian. It follows the Drumian Stage and precedes the Paibian Stage of the Furongian Series. The base is defined as the first appearance of the trilobite Lejopyge laevigata around  million years ago. The Guzhangian-Paibian boundary is marked by the first appearance of the trilobite Glyptagnostus reticulatus around  million years ago.

The name Guzhangian is derived from Guzhang County, Hunan Province, China.

The GSSP is defined in the Huaqiao Formation in Hunan. The precise base of the Guzhangian is a limestone layer 121.3 m above the base Huaqiao Formation(花桥组) at the Louyixi section, where Lejopyge laevigata has its first appearance.

References

 
Cambrian geochronology
Geological ages
Geologic formations of China